Paul John may refer to:

Paul John (rugby union) (born 1970), former Wales international rugby union player
Paul John (Yupik elder) (1929–2015), American Yup'ik elder, cultural advocate and commercial fisherman
Paul John (whisky), a brand of Indian single malt and single cask whisky

See also

 
 
 Paul Johns (born 1958), American football player 
 John (disambiguation)
 Paul (disambiguation)
 John Paul (disambiguation)
 Paul and John (disambiguation)

John, Paul